Elenak Airport is a public-use airport at Elenak on Kwajalein Atoll, Marshall Islands.

Airlines and destinations

References 

Airports in the Marshall Islands